Luiz Alberto de Sousa (born February 6, 1981 in São João Del Rey), or simply Beto, is a Brazilian left back. He currently plays for Ipatinga.

Honours
Minas Gerais State League: 2005

Contract
1 January 2008 to 1 January 2011

External links

 

1981 births
Living people
Brazilian footballers
Cruzeiro Esporte Clube players
Joinville Esporte Clube players
Tupi Football Club players
Ipatinga Futebol Clube players
Paulista Futebol Clube players
Club Athletico Paranaense players
Association football goalkeepers